Surface embroidery is any form of embroidery in which the pattern is worked by the use of decorative stitches and laid threads on top of the foundation fabric or canvas rather than through the fabric; it is contrasted with canvas work.

Much free embroidery is also surface embroidery, as are a few forms of counted-thread embroidery such as cross stitch.

Forms of surface embroidery
Applique
Art needlework
Crewel embroidery
Cross stitch
Goldwork
Jacobean embroidery
Stumpwork

Examples of surface embroideries
Bayeux Tapestry
Quaker tapestry

References

External links

Embroidery Stitch Tutorials

Embroidery